Digboi Assembly constituency is one of the 126 assembly constituencies of  Assam, a northeast state of India.  Digboi is also part of Dibrugarh Lok Sabha constituency.

Digboi Assembly constituency

Following are details on Digboi Assembly constituency-

Country: India.
 State: Assam.
 District:  Tinsukia district.
 Lok Sabha Constituency: Dibrugarh Lok Sabha/Parliamentary constituency.
 Assembly Categorisation: Semi Urban constituency.
 Literacy Level:70.92%.
 Eligible Electors as per 2021 General Elections: 1,40,132  Eligible Electors. Male Electors:69,298. Female Electors:70,825.
 Geographic Co-Ordinates:  27°21'06.1"N 95°36'16.2"E.
 Total Area Covered:440 square kilometres.
 Area Includes: Digboi thana [excluding Tirap (part) and Buridihing mouzas], Hapjan (part) and Tingrai (part) mouzas in Tinsukia thana and Tingrai (part) mouza, of Doom Dooma thana in Tinsukia sub- division.
 Inter State Border : Tinsukia.
 Number Of Polling Stations: Year 2011-140,Year 2016-140,Year 2021-123.

Members of Legislative Assembly

Following is the list of past members representing Digboi Assembly constituency in Assam Legislature.
 1951: Jadav Chandra Khakhlari, Indian National Congress.
 1951: Dalbir Singh Lohar, Indian National Congress.
 1958: Dwijesh Chandra Deb Sarma, Indian National Congress.
 1962: Dwijesh Chandra Deb Sarma, Indian National Congress.
 1967: J.N. Bhuyan, Indian National Congress.
 1972: Chandra Bahadur Chetri, Indian National Congress.
 1978: Rameswar Dhanowar, Indian National Congress (I).
 1983: Rameswar Dhanowar, Indian National Congress.
 1985: Rameswar Dhanowar, Indian National Congress.
 1991: Rameswar Dhanowar, Indian National Congress.
 1996: Rameswar Dhanowar, Indian National Congress.
 2001: Rameswar Dhanowar, Indian National Congress.
 2006: Rameswar Dhanowar, Indian National Congress.
 2011: Rameswar Dhanowar, Indian National Congress.
 2016: Suren Phukan, Bharatiya Janata Party.

Election results

2016 results

2011 results

2006 result

See also
 Digboi
 Tinsukia district
 List of constituencies of Assam Legislative Assembly

References

External links 
 

Assembly constituencies of Assam
Tinsukia district